St Matthias the Apostle Church is an Anglican church in the parish of Colindale, London, England.

References

External links
 St Matthias the Apostle Church - Facebook site

Colindale
Colindale
Diocese of London